Sarah Bern (born 10 July 1997) is an English rugby union player.

Early life
Bern began playing rugby as an 11-year-old with the boys. She initially played in the back row before switching to tighthead.

International career
She was named in the 2017 Women's Rugby World Cup squad for England. She was the youngest member of the squad at 20. Bern's scored a crucial try for England in their semi-final match against France to see them into the finals. She also won player of the match. 

She was named in the England squad for the delayed 2021 Rugby World Cup held in New Zealand in October and November 2022.

References

External links 
 RFU Player Profile

1997 births
Living people
England women's international rugby union players
English female rugby union players
Female rugby union players
21st-century English women